Clovis Regional Airport  is a city-owned, public-use airport located six nautical miles (7 mi, 11 km) east of the central business district of Clovis, a city in Curry County, New Mexico, United States. The facility opened in April, 1959 and is mostly used for general aviation, but is also served by one commercial airline. Current scheduled passenger service is subsidized by the Essential Air Service program. The airport was previously known as Clovis Municipal Airport but underwent a name change to Clovis Regional Airport in 2021 when it was upgraded to Part 121 status.

It is included in the National Plan of Integrated Airport Systems for 2011–2015, which categorized it as a general aviation airport (the commercial service category requires at least 2,500 enplanements per year).

Facilities and aircraft 

It also has one turf runway designated 8/26 which measures .

For the 12-month period ending February 28, 2019; the airport had 24,648 aircraft operations, an average of 68 per day: 85% general aviation, 7% military and 8% air taxi. At that time there were 56 aircraft based at this airport: 73% single-engine, 14% multi-engine, 11% jet, and 2% helicopter.

Airline and destinations 

The Denver Air Connection service is currently being operated with Embraer ERJ-145 regional jet aircraft.

Historical airline service 

Clovis was a stop on the first coast to coast "air/rail" service between Los Angeles and New York City which began in 1929. Transcontinental Air Transport (TAT) used a Ford Trimotor aircraft to fly passengers between Los Angeles and Clovis with en route stops at Kingman, AZ and Winslow, AZ as well as Albuquerque, NM. At Clovis, passengers heading east would then transfer and board an overnight train operated by the Atchison, Topeka and Santa Fe Railway to Waynoka, OK where they would connect to another TAT-operated Ford Trimotor aircraft the next morning and continue their journey to the Port Columbus Airport in Ohio (now the John Glenn Columbus International Airport) where they would transfer again for the final stage of the journey to New York City via the Pennsylvania Railroad. The same rail and flight services, transfers and connecting points were used by passengers heading west. In late 1930 the service had been modified to where the aircraft would fly the western portion of the service via Amarillo, TX rather than Clovis. Transcontinental Air Transport went on to merge with Western Air Express and form what would become Trans World Airlines (TWA) while Western Air Express would eventually once again regain its status as an independent air carrier and then subsequently be renamed Western Airlines. In later years, both TWA and Western evolved into major airlines operating extensive domestic and international route systems.

In 1948 a new carrier, Pioneer Airlines, began serving Clovis with the airport being one of several stops on a route between Albuquerque and Dallas Love Field. The other stops included Santa Fe, NM, Las Vegas, NM and Tucumcari, NM as well as Lubbock, TX, Abilene, TX, Mineral Wells, TX and Fort Worth, TX. A second route was then created between Amarillo and El Paso, TX with stops at Clovis, Roswell, NM, and Las Cruces, NM. This second route crossed at Clovis with the initial route between Albuquerque and Dallas which resulted in Clovis being a small hub for Pioneer Airlines where passengers were then able to connect between the two routes. Initially the airline used 21-seat Douglas DC-3 twin prop aircraft but then upgraded to the 36-seat Martin 2-0-2 twin prop aircraft in 1952.

In 1955 Pioneer was acquired by and merged into Continental Airlines which maintained the same basic service with DC-3 aircraft minus some of the stops and also subsequently upgraded its flights with Convair 340 twin prop aircraft followed by the British manufactured Vickers Viscount four engine turboprop in 1959 with the Viscount (which the airline referred to as the "Jet Power Viscount II" ) being the first turbine powered aircraft type to serve Clovis. The April 1, 1955 Continental system timetable listed three daily DC-3 flights serving the airport including a roundtrip Albuquerque - Santa Fe - Clovis - Lubbock - Abilene - Fort Worth - Dallas Love Field service as well as a one way westbound Houston Hobby Airport - College Station, TX - Temple, TX - Waco, TX - Dallas Love Field - Fort Worth - Abilene - Lubbock - Clovis - Santa Fe - Albuquerque flight.  According to the September 27, 1959 Continental Airlines timetable, a Viscount propjet was being operated on a daily roundtrip routing of Albuquerque (ABQ) - Santa Fe (SAF) - Clovis (via Cannon Air Force Base) (CVS) - Lubbock (LBB) - Abilene (ABI) - Fort Worth (via Greater Southwest International Airport) (GSW) - Dallas Love Field (DAL). Initially, all airline service had been operated via the current Cannon Air Force Base (CVS) and was then transferred to the Clovis Municipal Airport (CVN) which opened in 1959 and was subsequently renamed Clovis Regional in 2021.

As Continental continued to evolve into a major air carrier, in 1963 the airline then transferred all of their Clovis service as well as its services to other smaller cities in New Mexico to Trans-Texas Airways (TTa). Trans-Texas basically operated the same services previously flown by Continental with flights to Albuquerque  and Dallas Love Field originally reverting to DC-3 aircraft but later upgrading to Convair 240 prop aircraft followed by Convair 600 turboprops with the airline referring to the latter aircraft as the "Jet Powered TTa Silver Cloud 600". According to the August 1968 Trans-Texas system timetable, the airline was operating all of its flights from Clovis with Convair 600 propjets with four departures every weekday including nonstop service to Albuquerque, Lubbock, TX and Santa Fe, NM as well as direct no change of plane service to Abilene, TX, Big Spring, TX and Dallas Love Field.  TTa then changed its name to Texas International Airlines (TI) in 1969 and for a brief period during the late 1970s, TI introduced 85-seat Douglas DC-9-10 jet service to Clovis. This was the first time Clovis had jet service which was operated via the Cannon AFB (CVS) airfield in order to accommodate the DC-9s. According to the March 15, 1978 Texas International system timetable, the airline was operating three departures every weekday from the airport with two nonstops to Albuquerque (ABQ) which offered connections via ABQ to TI DC-9 jet service on to Dallas/Fort Worth (DFW), Houston (IAH) and Los Angeles (LAX) as well as a nonstop flight to Hobbs, NM with this service continuing on to Carlsbad, NM.  Also 1978, Texas International then reverted to once again using Convair 600 propjets via the Clovis Municipal Airport (CVN) for all of its flights with service only being operated nonstop to Albuquerque.

As Texas International was now growing into a larger all-jet airline, TI discontinued its Clovis flights in early 1979 and service was transferred to two smaller commuter airlines, Air Midwest and Crown Aviation. Crown had started service at Clovis two years prior with flights operated with twin prop Piper aircraft to Albuquerque and Lubbock but then went out of business in 1980. Air Midwest operated 17-seat Swearingen Metroliner propjets with flights to Albuquerque, Amarillo, and Wichita, KS. Mesa Airlines began serving Clovis in 1985 using Beechcraft 99 commuter turboprops followed by Beechcraft 1900C propjets on flights to Albuquerque. However, Air Midwest discontinued their service shortly afterwards. Mesa continued to serve the city for 20 years until 2005 when service was replaced by Great Lakes Aviation which operated flights to Albuquerque as well as a flight to Amarillo and Denver using Beechcraft 1900D turboprops. The flight to Amarillo was later dropped and all service was briefly shifted to a Clovis - Santa Fe - Denver route in 2012 before Great Lakes ended all flights on January 31, 2014. Clovis was without any airline service until July 2014 when Boutique Air inaugurated three daily nonstop flights to Dallas/Ft. Worth using 8-seat Pilatus PC-12 aircraft via a federal Essential Air Service contract. In August 2018, Boutique Air upgraded the aircraft used to multi-engine, nine-seat Beechcraft Super King Air model 350s. Boutique Air's EAS contract ended on May 1, 2020, at which time Key Lime Air dba Denver Air Connection began two daily flights to Denver using Fairchild Dornier 328JET regional jet aircraft. In late 2021, Denver Air Connection added a daily flight to Dallas/Fort Worth while reducing flights to Denver from two to one per day. The airline also upgraded their aircraft to a 50-seat Embraer ERJ-145 regional jet.

Statistics

References

Other sources 

 Essential Air Service documents (Docket OST-1996-1902) from the U.S. Department of Transportation:
 Order 2004-12-21 (December 29, 2004): selecting Great Lakes Aviation, Ltd., to provide essential air service with 19-passenger Beech B1900D aircraft at Clovis and Silver City/Hurley/Deming, New Mexico, for two years at a combined annual subsidy rate of $1,718,113.
 Order 2007-3-18 (March 20, 2007): selecting Great Lakes Aviation, Ltd. to provide subsidized essential air service (EAS) at Clovis and Silver City/Hurley/Deming, New Mexico, for two years, beginning May 1, 2007, through April 30, 2009. Clovis will receive 18 one-stop round trips per week to Denver at an annual subsidy of $999,932. Silver City/Hurley/Deming will receive 12 nonstop weekly round trips to Phoenix at an annual subsidy of $992,799. Both communities will be served with 19-passenger Beech 1900 aircraft. The total combined annual subsidy is $1,992,731.
 Order 2007-4-5 (April 4, 2007): the department is granting the motion of Grant County, New Mexico, to file a petition for reconsideration of Order 2007-3-18, issued March 20, 2007, and, upon review, deciding to vacate the earlier decision and resolicit Essential Air Service proposals.
 Order 2007-5-19 (May 31, 2007): selecting Great Lakes Aviation, Ltd. to provide subsidized essential air service (EAS) at Clovis and Silver City/Hurley/Deming, New Mexico, for two years, beginning May 1, 2007, through April 30, 2009. Clovis and Silver City/Hurley/Deming each will receive 12 nonstop round trips per week to Albuquerque with 19-passenger Beechcraft 1900D aircraft at an annual combined subsidy of $2,365,290.
 Order 2009-3-3 (March 6, 2009): re-selecting Great Lakes Aviation, Ltd. to provide essential air service (EAS) at Clovis and Silver City/Hurley/Deming, New Mexico, at a combined annual subsidy rate of $2,959,451 ($1,517,277 for Clovis and $1,442,174 for Silver City), for the two-year period from May 1, 2009, through April 30, 2011.
 Order 2011-4-19 (April 22, 2011): reselects Great Lakes Aviation, Ltd., to provide subsidized EAS with 19-passenger Beechcraft B-1900D aircraft at Clovis and Silver City/Hurley/Deming, New Mexico (Silver City), for the period from May 1, 2011, to May 31, 2013, at a combined annual subsidy rate of $3,186,249.
 Ninety-Day Notice (June 4, 2012) of Great Lakes Aviation, Ltd. serving notice of intent to terminate scheduled air service to·Clovis, New Mexico and Silver City/Hurley/Deming, New Mexico from Albuquerque, New Mexico effective September 3, 2012.

External links 
 
 Clovis Municipal Airport, official site
 Aerial image as of January 1996 from USGS The National Map
 

Airports in New Mexico
Essential Air Service
Buildings and structures in Curry County, New Mexico
Transportation in Curry County, New Mexico